Elizabeth Janet Browne (née Bell, born 30 March 1950) is a British historian of science, known especially for her work on the history of 19th-century biology. She taught at the Wellcome Trust Centre for the History of Medicine, University College, London, before returning to Harvard. She is currently Aramont Professor of the History of Science at Harvard University.

Biography

Browne is the daughter of Douglas Bell CBE (1905–1993) and his wife Betty Bell. She married Nicholas Browne in 1972; they have two daughters.

Browne gained a BA degree from Trinity College, Dublin in 1972 and from Imperial College, London an MSc (1973) and PhD (1978) on the history of science. She was a research fellow at Harvard University. She received an honorary Doctor in Science (Sc. D) degree from Trinity College, Dublin in 2009 in recognition of her contribution to the biographical knowledge of Charles Darwin.

After working as an associate editor on the University of Cambridge Library project to collect, edit, and publish the correspondence of Charles Darwin, she wrote a two-volume biography of the naturalist: Charles Darwin: Voyaging (1995), on his youth and years on the Beagle, and Charles Darwin: The Power of Place (2002), covering the years after the publication of his theory of evolution. The latter book has received acclaim for its innovative interpretation of the role of Darwin's correspondence in the formation of his scientific theory and recruitment of scientific support. In 2004, this volume won the History of Science Society's Pfizer Prize, the Society's highest honor awarded to individual works of scholarship. In 2003, it also won the James Tait Black Memorial Prize for Biography. In 2020 she was admitted as a member of the Royal Irish Academy.

Browne currently serves as the Aramont Professor in the History of Science at Harvard University. She specializes in life sciences, natural history, and evolutionary biology from the 17th to the 20th century.

Publications
The following is a selection of Browne's publications, chosen primarily by convenience from internet searches, but also to indicate the timespan over which she has published.

 Full article

 Also

References

External links
Janet Browne profile at Harvard University

1950 births
Historians of science
Harvard University faculty
Alumni of Trinity College Dublin
Alumni of Imperial College London
Academics of University College London
Charles Darwin biographers
Charles Darwin
Living people
James Tait Black Memorial Prize recipients
Historians of biology
Members of the American Philosophical Society
Members of the Royal Irish Academy
Corresponding Fellows of the British Academy